von der Lippe is the surname of a prominent Norwegian family, part of the historical Patriciate of Norway.

In Norway, the surname is most frequently associated with the descendants  Jacob von der Lippe (died 1702), who immigrated  from Bremen, Germany and became a citizen of Bergen, Norway in 1655. In Bergen, family members were merchants and business people. Later, the family had clergy members and other officials, as well as theater people, and various other professions. 

Within Scandinavian countries, there have been several people with the surname von der Lippe without family lines  known between them.

Notable members
Jakob von der Lippe (1872–1953) Norwegian admiral
Anneke von der Lippe (born 1964) Norwegian actress
Frits von der Lippe (1901–1988) Norwegian journalist and theatre director
Anton Barth von der Lippe (1886–1960)  Norwegian whaler
Conrad Fredrik von der Lippe (1833–1901) Norwegian architect
Susan von der Lippe (born 1965) American Olympic Swimmer
Tania Michelet (born von der Lippe, 1969), Norwegian author

Literature
Steffens, Haagen Krog  (1911) Norske Slægter 1912 (Kristiania)
Cappelen, Hans    (1976) Norske slektsvåpen   (Oslo 2nd ed.), p. 155

External links
Family of Jacob von der Lippe

Norwegian families
Patriciate of Norway
Norwegian-language surnames
Norwegian people of German descent